Olearius is a surname. Notable people with the surname include:

 Adam Olearius (1603–1671), German scholar, mathematician, geographer and librarian
 Johann Olearius (1611–1684), German theologian and hymnwriter

See also 

 Omphalotus olearius, commonly known as the Jack o'Lantern mushroom
 Ranella olearius, a species of large sea snail
 Olearia, a genus of flowering plants belonging to the family Asteraceae

Latin-language surnames
Occupational surnames